Carlo Bononi (1569? - 1632) was an Italian painter.

From an 1876 book:

Giulio Cromer, Carlo Bononi a pupil of Bastaruolo, and Alfonso Rivarola or Chenda, were the last artists of any eminence in Ferrara.

Biography

Born and active mainly in Emilia and Ferrara, and considered to be mainly a painter of the School of Ferrara. He studied painting under Giuseppe Mazzuoli, known as il Bastarolo. He knew Guercino and was eulogized by Guido Reni as having a "bounty of a most honest life, a great knowledge of design, and strength in colorizing". Bononi rose to prominence in Ferrara when the painter Scarsellino died, and the former called to Rome. He was initially buried in Santa Maria in Vado, for which he had helped decorate the ceiling with various canvases.

Among his pupils were Alfonso Rivarola (il Chenda), Giovanni Battista dalla Torre, and Camillo Berlinghieri. His nephew, Leonello Bononi was also a painter.

An important exhibition has been held at Palazzo dei Diamanti in Ferrara in Autumn 2017.

Selected works 
 Second of four chapels, (Basilica della Ghiara, Reggio Emilia)
St Louis of Toulouse Praying for the end of the Plague (Kunsthistoriches Museum, Vienna)
Madonna of Loreto appearing to Saints John the Evangelist, Bartholemew, and James the Great,
Guardian Angel (late 1620s, National picture gallery at Palazzo dei Diamanti, Ferrara) 
Ste Barbara
Saint Dominic in Soriano, .
Saint Sebastian and the Angel , late 1620s, Musée des Beaux-Arts de Strasbourg

References

Sources 
Fondazione Manodori website.

External links 

 Census of Ferrarese Paintings and Drawings 

1569 births
1630s deaths
Painters from Ferrara
16th-century Italian painters
Italian male painters
17th-century Italian painters
Renaissance painters